Khuda Ki Basti Incremental Development Scheme (KKB-IDS) is an internationally recognized innovation in affordable housing for the urban poor. It addresses the weaknesses and improves upon the World Bank-administered Site and Services approach which had been initiated in Madras, India to address the urban shelter crisis, but had faced mounting criticism for its failure to reach the lowest income strata of the urban population.

The KKB-IDS model was initiated and developed by Hyderabad Development Authority under the leadership of Tasneem Ahmad Siddiqui near Hyderabad, Sindh, Pakistan in 1986, and has since been replicated at three additional sites, namely Gharo, Karachi and Lahore.

The model is recognized as one of the best options for addressing the growing shelter crisis in urban centres. In 1995 KKB-IDS attained international recognition by being awarded the prestigious Aga Khan Award for Architecture, while its founder Tasneem Ahmad Siddiqui has received the Ramon Magsaysay Award in the Philippines and Sitara-e-Imtiaz by the Government of Pakistan.

Background 

Since its inception in 1947, Pakistan has faced a mounting shelter crisis for its low-income urban population. The lack of affordable housing in urban centres has resulted in the creation of squatter settlements or shanty towns, known in Pakistan as "katchi abadis".

Although the government has undertaken several initiatives to provide affordable housing for the urban poor over the last five decades, these schemes have failed to reach the target market or play any significant role in stemming the tide against the shelter crisis. While the state has failed to address the issue, the informal sector has filled the gap by providing illegally occupied state land to the urban poor on affordable terms, resulting in the mushroom growth of squatter settlements that are today home to nearly 40% of the Pakistan's urban population.

The absence of civic amenities for these illegal settlements (such as potable water, sewage, education and health facilities) results in such populations becoming vulnerable to epidemics, unemployment, crime, and other social problems. Meanwhile, the crisis continues to exacerbate due to rising rural-income migration resulting from lack of employment opportunities in rural areas.

Narrative

In 1983, the Hyderabad Development Authority (HDA) launched the Gulshan-e-Shahbaz housing scheme based on the World Bank's site and services model. A section of the scheme was designed to provide affordable housing to Hyderabad's low-income population. However, Gulshan-e-Shahbaz remained uninhabited and failed to achieve the desired results.

Upon assuming the leadership of HDA as its Director General in 1985, Tasneem Ahmad Siddiqui, a career civil servant with an interest in affordable housing, strived to assess the reasons for failure of Gulshan-e-Shahbaz. Tasneem undertook a detailed assessment of the scheme with the help of Azhar Khan (Planning Chief HDA), and concluded that the failure resulted from certain flaws in the World Bank's site and services approach (like lack of targeting, delays in handing over possession of plots, cumbersome procedures) which rendered the scheme unsuitable for the low-income strata of the population.

Based on these insights, HDA decided to experiment with a new approach towards affordable housing by introducing certain innovations in the original design, with the intention of better fulfilling the needs of the urban poor, and utilizing important lessons from the modus operandi of informal land developers. This experiment proved to be the birth of a new model that has since evolved into the Khuda-ki-basti Incremental Development Scheme (KKB-IDS).

Model Process

Loosely translated as the "City of God", the Khuda Ki Basti model is based on the concept of 'incremental housing' whereby residents are provided with a piece of land (80 sq yds) on affordable terms with minimum infrastructure where they build their house progressively or incrementally, with their own labor and financial resources.

The core idea behind KKB-IDS is that people should settle before houses and infrastructure are constructed and that, once settled, they can develop their housing and infrastructure incrementally, as and when allowed by the availability of resources.

In this concept, KKB-IDS imitates the approach followed by the illegal subdividers: it is characterized by ease of entry, immediate delivery of the plot and incremental development of the houses and the infrastructure. This implies the following sequence of settlement:

PEOPLE--> LAND--> HOUSING--> INFRASTRUCTURE

The low income family in need of shelter is initially required to spend two weeks in a reception area to prove its urgent need for shelter. Then a plot is allocated upon depositing the down-payment which partially covers the cost of the plot. The balance amount is recovered in easy instalments over a period of five years. The family has to live on the plot permanently; the plot is repossessed if found unoccupied, which reduces absentee ownership and speculation. There is no enforcement of any standards for housing, and this enables the allottees to build their houses according to their individual needs and resources. Once settled, the allottee is urged to make regular payments into a neighbourhood account, so that the provision of infrastructure can be financed, once sufficient funds have been accumulated. This eliminates the need for cost recovery.

Another important element of the KKB project is that it encourages people to undertake immediate construction of houses. In conventional site and services schemes, colossal amounts of public money are wasted by the degeneration of facilities not used for decades because the plots are used as safe investments and are sold and resold many times before final construction of houses takes place. Conventional public housing as well as site and services schemes are unaffordable for the low-income group owing to enforcement of building standards and high costs of infrastructure.

In order to institutionalize the lessons learnt from KKB-IDS, in 1992 Tasneem Ahmad Siddiqui set up an NGO ‘Saiban-Action Research for Shelter’  that has replicated the KKB-IDS model in 3 additional sites in Pakistan. The evolution of the model has been a topic of research by international publications including GMSARN International Journal.

Today these housing schemes are thriving and provide shelter to hundreds of thousands of urban poor. The success of KKB-IDS provides evidence in favour of the idea that incrementally developing houses and housing services offer the most cost-effective and affordable option of developing habitats for the urban poor.

Sustainability

In 1987 the Dutch social scientist Dr. Jan van der Linden conducted a study on the sustainability and impact of the KKB-IDS model.

He concluded that the model is a sustainable project because it is based on the principles of full cost recovery, affordability for low-income people, public participation, incremental development of houses and infrastructure, public private partnership, and community organization. It replicates the methods used by squatters in the development of squatter settlements, yet it is successful in developing a legal, planned and healthy residential environment for low-income people. While the conventional public housing schemes and even site and services have proved to be unaffordable for low-income people, the KKB has been successful in providing affordable shelter to the urban poor.

One of the major achievements of KKB is the organization of low income communities which becomes an asset for the future maintenance and sustenance of the infrastructure developed on self-help basis.

Demographics 
Muhajirs are the largest ethnic group in Khuda ki Basti.

References

Neighbourhoods of Karachi
Gadap Town